Ponor is a natural surface opening in karst limestone landscapes.

It may also mean:

Places
 Ponor, Alba, a commune in Romania
 Ponor, a village in Pui Commune, Hunedoara County, Romania
 Ponor, a river in Bihor County and Cluj County, Romania, tributary of the Someșul Cald
 Ponor (Nerskaya), a river in Moscow Oblast, Russia, tributary of the Nerskaya
 Ponor, Sofia Province, a hamlet near Kostinbrod, Sofia Province, Bulgaria
 Ponor (mountain), part of the Balkan Mountains in Bulgaria
 Ponor (Knjaževac), a village in Serbia
 Ponor (Pirot), a village in Serbia
 Ponor, Olovo, a village in Bosnia and Herzegovina
 Ponor (Pale), a village in Bosnia and Herzegovina

People
 Cătălina Ponor (b. 1987), a Romanian gymnast